Sikeston St. Louis, Iron Mountain and Southern Railway Depot, also known as the Sikeston Missouri Pacific Railroad Depot, is a historic train station building located at Sikeston, Scott County, Missouri. It was built in 1916-1917 by the St. Louis, Iron Mountain and Southern Railway, and is a one-story, rectangular brick building measuring 24 feet by 100 feet.  It has a hipped, red ceramic tile roof with wide eaves supported by curvilinear brackets.  It houses a local history museum.

It was added to the National Register of Historic Places in 2000.

References

External links
The Sikeston Depot

St. Louis, Iron Mountain and Southern Railway
History museums in Missouri
Railway stations on the National Register of Historic Places in Missouri
Railway stations in the United States opened in 1917
Buildings and structures in Scott County, Missouri
National Register of Historic Places in Scott County, Missouri
Stations along Missouri Pacific Railroad lines
Former railway stations in Missouri